Ramgaijang is a village near Jiribam in  Jiribam district of Manipur, India.

References

Villages in Jiribam district